Viola Goretzki (later Landvoigt, born 23 November 1956) is a retired German rower. She won a world title in 1975 and an Olympic gold medal in 1976 at the 1976 Montreal in the eight event. For these achievements she was awarded the Patriotic Order of Merit in 1976. Her husband Bernd Landvoigt, brother-in-law Jörg Landvoigt and nephew Ike Landvoigt are also retired Olympic rowers.

References 

1956 births
Living people
People from Zwickau
People from Bezirk Karl-Marx-Stadt
East German female rowers
Sportspeople from Saxony
Olympic rowers of East Germany
Rowers at the 1976 Summer Olympics
Olympic gold medalists for East Germany
Olympic medalists in rowing
World Rowing Championships medalists for East Germany
Medalists at the 1976 Summer Olympics
Recipients of the Patriotic Order of Merit in silver